General Lee commonly refers to the Confederate States Army General Robert E. Lee.

General Lee may also refer to:

People
Albert Lindley Lee (1834–1907), Union Army brigadier general
Benjamin Lee (general) (1774–1828), North Carolina State Militia brigadier general in the American Revolutionary War
Charles Lee (general) (c. 1732–1782), Continental Army major general
Edward M. Lee (fl. 1860s), Union Army brevet brigadier general
Edwin Gray Lee (1836–1870), Confederate States Army brigadier general, cousin of Robert
Fitzhugh Lee (1835–1905), Confederate States and United States Army major general, nephew of Robert
George Washington Custis Lee (1832–1913), Confederate States Army major general, son of Robert
Harry Lee (United States Marine) (1872–1935), U.S. Marine Corps general
Harry Lee (sheriff) (1932–2007), U.S. National Guard general
Henry Lee III (1756–1818), U.S. Army major general during the Whiskey Rebellion, father of Robert E. Lee
James Madison Lee (1926–2017), U.S. Army general
John C. H. Lee (1887–1958), U.S. Army lieutenant general during World War II
Robert Merrill Lee (1909–2003), U.S. Air Force general
Stephen D. Lee (1833–1908), Confederate States Army lieutenant general
William C. Lee (1895–1948), U.S. Army major general during World War II
William Henry Fitzhugh Lee (1837–1891), Confederate States Army major general, son of Robert
William Lee (American judge) (died c. 1823), Georgia Volunteer Militia brigadier general

Fictional
General Tani, a Takeshi's Castle character known as General Lee in the UK and Indian versions

Other
 M3 Lee, medium tank used in World War II
 General Beauregard Lee, the name for one of the groundhogs that predicts the weather on the American holiday known as Groundhog Day
 General Lee (car), a fictional automobile driven by Bo and Luke Duke in the 1979–1985 American television series The Dukes of Hazzard.
 "The General Lee" (song), a 1981 song by Johnny Cash for The Dukes of Hazzard soundtrack

See also
Attorney General Lee (disambiguation)